The National Amalgamated Furnishing Trades Association (NAFTA) was a trade union representing workers involved in making furniture in the United Kingdom.

History
The union was founded in 1902 from the merger of the Alliance Cabinet Makers' Association and the United Operative Cabinet and Chairmakers Society of Scotland. In 1911, the Amalgamated Society of Gilders and Amalgamated Society of French Polishers both merged into the new organisation.  In 1907, the union had 7,007 members.

In 1946, the union merged with the Amalgamated Union of Upholsterers to form the National Union of Furniture Trade Operatives.

Election results
In its early years, the union sponsored several Labour Party candidates, some of whom won election.

Leadership

General Secretaries
1902: Harry Ham
1905: Alex Gossip
1941: Alf Tomkins

Parliamentary Secretaries
1906: James O'Grady
1919: James Patrick Gardner
1937: F. E. Sweetman

Assistant General Secretaries
1907: H. A. Urie
1937: Alf Tomkins
1946: Alf Bickness

References

Trade unions established in 1902
Trade unions disestablished in 1946
Furniture industry trade unions
Trade unions based in London